Like other Colombian states, Santander issued its own postage stamps between  1884 and 1905, with a provisional stamp appearing in 1907.  The designs were based on the state's coat of arms, except for a 50c  stamp in 1904 featuring a locomotive.  All of the stamps of Santander are readily available.

Sources 
 Stanley Gibbons Ltd: various catalogues
 Encyclopaedia of Postal Authorities
Rossiter, Stuart & John Flower. The Stamp Atlas. London: Macdonald, 1986.

External links
Colombia-Panama Philatelic Study Group

Philately of Colombia
Santander Department